Rene Bitorajac (born 2 March 1972) is a Croatian actor. He has appeared in a number of Croatian and Bosnian films since the 1980s. Most notably, he starred in the 2001 Academy Award-winning Bosnian film No Man's Land. He is also known for starring in popular Croatian television sitcoms Bitange i princeze (2005–2010) and Naša mala klinika (2004–2007).

Bitorajac won Golden Arena Awards for Best Actor for his portrayals of sociopathic football hooligan Krpa in the 2009 film Metastases, and Dr. Babić in the 2012 film Cannibal Vegetarian. His role in the latter earned him the Vladimir Nazor Award and the Paris Mediteraneo Gran Prix, among other accolades.

Bitorajac also worked prominently in Croatian-language versions of animated features. He provided voice acting for Syndrome in The Incredibles, Buck in Home on the Range (both 2004), Ham in Space Chimps (2008), Gru in the Despicable Me franchise (2010-present) and Red in The Angry Birds Movie (2016) complete with its 2019 sequel.

Selected filmography

References

External links

1972 births
21st-century Croatian male actors
20th-century Croatian male actors
Living people
Male actors from Zagreb
Academy of Dramatic Art, University of Zagreb alumni
Croatian male actors
Croatian male film actors
Croatian male television actors
Croatian male stage actors
Croatian male voice actors
Golden Arena winners
Croatian Theatre Award winners